The Serbian First Football League (Serbian: Prva Liga Srbija) is the second-highest football league in Serbia. The league is operated by the Serbian FA. 18 teams will compete in this league for the 2011–12 season.  Two teams will be promoted to the Serbian Superliga and four will be relegated to the Serbian League, the third-highest division overall in the Serbian football league system.

2011–12 teams

League table

Results

Top goalscorers

Including matches played on 6 June 2012; Source: Prva liga official website

References

 Official website
 rbijasport.net

See also 
 Serbian SuperLiga
 Serbian First League
 Serbian League
 Serbia national football team
 List of football clubs in Serbia

Serbian First League seasons
2011–12 in Serbian football leagues
Serbia